Arkansas Valley may refer to:

 the floodplain and associated areas along the Arkansas River in Colorado, Kansas, Oklahoma, and Arkansas
 Arkansas River Valley region in Arkansas
 Arkansas Valley (ecoregion), an ecoregion defined by the United States Environmental Protection Agency in Arkansas and Oklahoma